The third round of AFC matches for 2018 FIFA World Cup qualification was played from 1 September 2016 to 5 September 2017.

Format
A total of twelve teams which advanced from the second round (the eight group winners and the four best group runners-up) were divided into two groups of six teams to play home-and-away round-robin matches. The top two teams of each group qualified for the 2018 FIFA World Cup, and the two third-placed teams advanced to the fourth round.

Qualified teams

Seeding 
The draw for the third round was held on 12 April 2016, at 16:30 MST (UTC+8), at the Mandarin Oriental Hotel in Kuala Lumpur, Malaysia.

The seeding were based on the FIFA World Rankings of April 2016 (shown in parentheses below). The twelve teams were seeded into six pots:

Pot 1 contained the teams ranked 1–2.
Pot 2 contained the teams ranked 3–4.
Pot 3 contained the teams ranked 5–6.
Pot 4 contained the teams ranked 7–8.
Pot 5 contained the teams ranked 9–10.
Pot 6 contained the teams ranked 11–12.

Each group contained one team from each of the six pots. The fixtures of each group were automatically decided based on the respective pot of each team.

Note: Bolded teams qualified for the World Cup. Italicised teams qualified for the fourth round.

Groups

Group A

Group B

Goalscorers
There were 129 goals scored in 60 matches, for an average of  goals per match.

5 goals

 Tomi Juric
 Mohannad Abdul-Raheem
 Nawaf Al-Abed
 Ahmed Khalil

4 goals

 Sardar Azmoun
 Genki Haraguchi
 Hassan Al-Haydos
 Ali Mabkhout

3 goals

 Mile Jedinak
 Mathew Leckie
 Mehdi Taremi
 Mahmoud Al-Mawas
 Omar Kharbin

2 goals

 Gao Lin
 Saad Abdul-Amir
 Takuma Asano
 Yuya Kubo
 Akram Afif
 Fahad Al-Muwallad
 Mohammad Al-Sahlawi
 Yahya Al-Shehri
 Ki Sung-yueng
 Koo Ja-cheol
 Teerasil Dangda
 Marat Bikmaev

1 goal

 Tim Cahill
 Jackson Irvine
 Massimo Luongo
 Tom Rogic
 Trent Sainsbury
 Hao Junmin
 Wu Lei
 Wu Xi
 Xiao Zhi
 Yu Dabao
 Yu Hai
 Reza Ghoochannejhad
 Jalal Hosseini
 Alireza Jahanbakhsh
 Ayman Hussein
 Mahdi Kamil
 Justin Meram
 Ahmed Yasin
 Keisuke Honda
 Yosuke Ideguchi
 Shinji Kagawa
 Hiroshi Kiyotake
 Yasuyuki Konno
 Shinji Okazaki
 Yuya Osako
 Hotaru Yamaguchi
 Maya Yoshida
 Ali Assadalla
 Sebastián Soria
 Salem Al-Dawsari
 Taisir Al-Jassim
 Salman Al-Moasher
 Nasser Al-Shamrani
 Omar Hawsawi
 Hong Jeong-ho
 Hwang Hee-chan
 Ji Dong-won
 Lee Chung-yong
 Nam Tae-hee
 Son Heung-min
 Ahmad Al Salih
 Omar Al Somah
 Tamer Haj Mohamad
 Pokklaw Anan
 Tana Chanabut
 Mongkol Tossakrai
 Ismail Matar
 Odil Ahmedov
 Alexander Geynrikh
 Egor Krimets
 Otabek Shukurov

1 own goal

 Zheng Zhi
 Ahmad Ibrahim
 Tanaboon Kesarat

Notes

References

External links

Qualifiers – Asia: Round 3, FIFA.com
FIFA World Cup, the-AFC.com
FIFA World Cup 2018, stats.the-AFC.com

3
Qual3
Qual3
Iran at the 2018 FIFA World Cup
South Korea at the 2018 FIFA World Cup
Japan at the 2018 FIFA World Cup
Saudi Arabia at the 2018 FIFA World Cup
Australia at the 2018 FIFA World Cup